George Garlick (26 February 1921 – 8 February 1993) was an  Australian rules footballer who played with North Melbourne in the Victorian Football League (VFL).

Notes

External links 

1921 births
1993 deaths
Australian rules footballers from Victoria (Australia)
North Melbourne Football Club players
Yarraville Football Club players